SDT may refer to be:

 Scottish Dance Theatre
 Self-determination theory
 Service Description Table
 Sigma Delta Tau
 Signal detection theory
 Social dominance theory
 Sonodynamic therapy
 Specially Designated Terrorist
 Shizuoka Daiichi Television
 Second demographic transition
 San Diego Trolley